Outlaws of Boulder Pass is a 1942 American Western film directed by Sam Newfield. The film stars George Houston as the "Lone Rider" and Al St. John as his sidekick "Fuzzy" Jones, and Dennis Moore as Sheriff Smoky Hammer, with Marjorie Manners, I. Stanford Jolley and Karl Hackett. The film was released on 12 June 1942, by Producers Releasing Corporation.

This is the last of the eleven "Lone Rider" films starring George Houston as Tom Cameron. Starting with the next film, Overland Stagecoach, the Lone Rider will be played by Robert Livingston.

Houston, once an opera singer, sang two songs in this film: "Let Me Keep Roamin' the Prairie" and "The Grass Is Always Green in Sunshine Valley". The songs were written by Johnny Lange and Lew Porter.

Cast 
George Houston as Tom Cameron, the Lone Rider
Al St. John as Fuzzy Jones
Dennis Moore as Sheriff Smoky Hammer
Marjorie Manners as Tess Hammer, alias Tess Clayton
I. Stanford Jolley as Gil Harkness
Karl Hackett as Sid Clayton
Charles King as Henchman Jake
Ted Adams as Sheriff
Kenne Duncan as Henchman Mulie
Frank Ellis as Henchman Ringo

Soundtrack 
George Houston - "The Lone Rider Song" (Written by Johnny Lange and Lew Porter)

See also
The "Lone Rider" films starring George Houston:
 The Lone Rider Rides On (1941)
 The Lone Rider Crosses the Rio (1941)
 The Lone Rider in Ghost Town (1941)
 The Lone Rider in Frontier Fury (1941)
 The Lone Rider Ambushed (1941)
 The Lone Rider Fights Back (1941)
 The Lone Rider and the Bandit (1942)
 The Lone Rider in Cheyenne (1942)
 The Lone Rider in Texas Justice (1942)
 Border Roundup (1942)
 Outlaws of Boulder Pass (1942)
starring Robert Livingston: 
 Overland Stagecoach (1942)
 Wild Horse Rustlers (1943)
 Death Rides the Plains (1943)
 Wolves of the Range (1943)
 Law of the Saddle (1943)
 Raiders of Red Gap (1943)

References

External links 

1942 films
American black-and-white films
1942 Western (genre) films
Producers Releasing Corporation films
American Western (genre) films
1940s English-language films
Films directed by Sam Newfield
1940s American films